Bannister is a variant spelling of banister.  However, it is a relatively common proper name as well.

People
People whose surname is or was Bannister include:

Alan Bannister (cyclist) (1922–2007), British silver medallist at the 1948 Summer Olympics
Alan Bannister (born 1951), American retired professional baseball player
Alex Bannister (born 1979), American former football player
Arthur Bannister (1875–1958), English cricketer
Billy Bannister (1879–1942), English professional footballer
Brian Bannister (born 1981), American baseball player
Brown Bannister, music producer and songwriter
Bruce Bannister (born 1947), British retired professional football player
Calvin Bannister (born 1984), Canadian footballer
Carys Bannister (1935–2010), British neurosurgeon
Charles Bannister (1738–1804), British stage actor
Charlie Bannister (1879–1952), English footballer
Clive Bannister (born 1958), British, Chair Museum of London 
Drew Bannister (born 1974), Canadian ice hockey player
Edward Bannister QC, British judge
Edward Mitchell Bannister (c.1828–1901), Canadian-American painter 
Ernest Bannister, English footballer
Floyd Bannister (born 1955), American former baseball player
Freddy Bannister, British concert promoter in the 1960s and 1970s
Gary Bannister (born 1960), English former football player
Geoffrey Bannister (born 1946), English-American educator and geographer
Grace Bannister (died 1986), Northern Ireland politician
Harry Bannister (1889–1961), American stage, film and television actor
Jack Bannister (1930–2016), English cricketer and sports reporter
Jack Bannister (footballer) (born 1942), English footballer
Jarrod Bannister (born 1984), Australian javelin thrower
Jenny Bannister Australian fashion designer
Jim Bannister (born 1929), English footballer 
Jimmy Bannister (1880–1953) English football player
Jo Bannister (born 1951), British crime fiction novelist
John Bannister (disambiguation)
Jordan Bannister (born 1982), Australian rules football umpire and former player
Joseph Bannister, English pirate
Keith Bannister (footballer, born 1923), English former professional footballer
Keith Bannister (footballer, born 1930), English former professional footballer
Ken Bannister (born 1960), American retired professional basketball player
Matthew Bannister (born 1957), British media executive and broadcaster.
Matthew Bannister (musician) (born 1962), New Zealand musician, journalist, and academic
Michael Bannister, Scottish musician
Mike Bannister (born 1949), former chief pilot of British Airways' Concorde fleet
Miriam Bannister (1817–1928), English-American supercentenarian
Neil Bannister (born 1973), English former cricketer
Neville Bannister (born 1937), English former footballer
Nonna Bannister (1927–2004), Soviet-born American author 
Paul Bannister (born 1947), English former footballer
Reggie Bannister (born 1945), American actor and musician
Richard Bannister Hughes (1810-1875), British businessman, active in Uruguay
Roger Bannister (1929–2018), British athlete, the first man to run a four-minute mile
Saxe Bannister (1790–1877), British-Australian lawyer and writer
Steve Bannister (born 1987), English rugby league player
Thomas Bannister (1799–1874), British-Australian soldier and explorer
Trevor Bannister (1934–2011), English actor
Turpin Bannister (1904–1982), American architectural historian

Places
Bannister, Michigan
Bannister, Missouri
North Bannister, Western Australia
Bannister River, Western Australia

Ships
, British coaster previously named Empire Lundy

See also
Banister (surname)
 Banister

English-language surnames
Norman-language surnames
Occitan-language surnames
Surnames of French origin
Occupational surnames